Sakineh Almasi (born 1979) is an Iranian politician and the current member of the Parliament of Iran, representing Kangan, Jam, Dayyer and Asaluyeh district. She is also Vice President of Federation of War Veterans and Disabled Persons of Iran.

References

1979 births
Living people
Members of the 10th Islamic Consultative Assembly
Moderation and Development Party politicians
Members of the Women's fraction of Islamic Consultative Assembly